Data East Arcade Classics is a compilation of video games created by Japanese video game company Data East. The collection disc is developed by American studio G1M2 and published and released by Majesco Entertainment for the Wii on February 19, 2010.

Games
Data East Arcade Classics consists of the arcade versions of the following 15 arcade games:
 Bad Dudes Vs. DragonNinja 
 Burnin' Rubber 
 BurgerTime
 Caveman Ninja 
 Express Raider 
 Heavy Barrel
 Lock 'n' Chase
 Magical Drop III
 Peter Pepper's Ice Cream Factory 
 Side Pocket
 Sly Spy 
 Street Slam
 SRD: Super Real Darwin 
 Two Crude 
 Wizard Fire

On top of this, the game features many unlockable bonus content items.

Reception

The game received "mixed" reviews according to the review aggregation website Metacritic.

References

External links
 

2010 video games
Data East video games
Majesco Entertainment games
North America-exclusive video games
Wii-only games
Wii games
Video game compilations
Video games developed in the United States